Katharine Doob Sakenfeld (born 1940) is an American Old Testament scholar. She is Professor of Old Testament Literature and Exegesis Emerita at Princeton Theological Seminary, having previously been William Albright Eisenberger Professor of Old Testament Literature and Exegesis.

Sakenfeld studied at the University of Rhode Island and Harvard Divinity School before obtaining her Ph.D. at Harvard University. She was ordained as a Presbyterian teaching elder in 1970, and has served as the moderator of the Presbytery of New Brunswick in the PCUSA. She served on the translation committee of the New Revised Standard Version, and was president of the Society of Biblical Literature in 2007.

Sakenfeld was written commentaries on Numbers and Ruth, and was general editor of the New Interpreter's Dictionary of the Bible. In 2006 a Festschrift was published in her honor: Engaging the Bible in a Gendered World: An Introduction to Feminist Biblical Interpretation in Honor of Katharine Doob Sakenfeld, which included contributions from F. W. Dobbs-Allsopp, Choon-Leong Seow, Phyllis Bird and Patrick D. Miller.

Selected works
 The meaning of hesed in the Hebrew Bible : a new inquiry, 1977
 Faithfulness in action : loyalty in Biblical perspective , 1985
 Journeying with God : a commentary on the book of Numbers, 1995
 Just wives? : stories of power and survival in the Old Testament and today, 2003

References

1940 births
Living people
Princeton Theological Seminary faculty
American biblical scholars
Old Testament scholars
Bible commentators
Translators of the Bible into English
Presbyterian Church (USA) teaching elders
University of Rhode Island alumni
Harvard Divinity School alumni
Female biblical scholars
Female Bible Translators